Prince Jack is a 1985 film from Castle Hill Productions which dramatizes some of the inner workings of the Kennedy administration, including efforts by Attorney General Robert F. Kennedy to address the issues arising from the Civil Rights Movement. Although primarily a dramatic narrative, Prince Jack also uses satire and black humor, especially with regard to the Kennedy brothers' complicated relationship with Lyndon B. Johnson.

Prince Jack covers the period from the Democratic National Convention in July 1960 to the autumn of 1963, just prior to the assassination of John F. Kennedy. The film was written and directed by Bert Lovitt.

Cast
 Robert J. Hogan - John F. Kennedy
 James F. Kelly - Robert F. Kennedy
 Lloyd Nolan - Joseph P. Kennedy, Sr.
 Kenneth Mars - Lyndon B. Johnson
 Dana Andrews - The Cardinal
 Robert Guillaume - Martin Luther King Jr.
 Cameron Mitchell - Edwin Walker
 Jim Backus - Ted Dealey
 William Windom - Ferguson ("Fergie")
 Theodore Bikel - Georgi Bolshakov

See also
 Kennedy (TV miniseries)
 Hoover vs. The Kennedys
 The Kennedys (TV miniseries)
 Civil rights movement in popular culture
 Cultural depictions of John F. Kennedy

Notes
 This was Jim Backus' last live project before his death.
 James F. Kelly portrayed Robert F. Kennedy a total of seven times in different productions between 1981 and 1997. He also portrayed John F. Kennedy once. 
 Prince Jack was available on VHS, but it does not appear to have been released on DVD.

External links

1985 films
Films scored by Elmer Bernstein
Films about the Kennedy family
Films about John F. Kennedy
Films set in the 1960s
Civil rights movement in film
Cultural depictions of John F. Kennedy
Cultural depictions of Robert F. Kennedy
Cultural depictions of Lyndon B. Johnson
Cultural depictions of Martin Luther King Jr.
1980s English-language films
1980s American films